Sue Wright (born 28 June 1970) is a former professional squash player from England. She was runner-up at the British Open in 1991 and 2000, and reached a career-high ranking of World No. 3 in 1998. She won the British National Championship title four times in 1992, 1997, 1998 and 2001. As a junior player, Wright captained the England team which won the world junior team title in 1987. During the last few years of her career, Wright suffered from viral pneumonia, which left her with ear problems that prevented her from flying and competing outside the United Kingdom.

She represented England at the 1992 Women's World Team Squash Championships in Vancouver, British Columbia, Canada, the 1994 Women's World Team Squash Championships in Saint Peter Port, Guernsey and the 1998 Women's World Team Squash Championships in Stuttgart, Germany.

Wright retired from professional squash in 2001.

World Team Championships

Finals: 2 (0 title, 2 runner-up)

References

External links 
 Page at Squashpics.com
 
 Squashtalk.com article on Wright's retirement in 2001

1970 births
Living people
English female squash players
Commonwealth Games gold medallists for England
Commonwealth Games bronze medallists for England
Commonwealth Games medallists in squash
Squash players at the 1998 Commonwealth Games
Competitors at the 1997 World Games
Medallists at the 1998 Commonwealth Games